Faenza Calcio is an Italian professional football team based in Faenza. The team is a member of the Eccellenza.

Current squad
2016/17 squad

References

External links
 Official site
 Eccellenza official site

Association football clubs established in 1912
Faenza
Football clubs in Italy
1912 establishments in Italy